Roger Hanif Armour (19 August 1934 – 17 September 2020) was a British vascular surgeon and inventor of the lens-free ophthalmoscope.

Life
Roger Armour was born on 19 August 1934 in Murree in Northern India (subsequently in Pakistan). His father was a veterinary surgeon and his mother taught English.

He graduated MBBS from the King Edward Medical College, Lahore in 1956. He then settled in Britain, qualifying ChM, FRCSEd, FRCSEng, MRCP and DTM&H. After training posts in neurological surgery, cardiac and thoracic surgery, and ophthalmology he specialized in general and vascular surgery. He studied vascular and micro-vascular surgery at Nashville and Zurich respectively as Hamilton Bailey Prize-winner (1973–74). He was consultant surgeon in Birkenhead at St Catherine's Hospital and Birkenhead Children's Hospital, and in Wallasey (1969-1972), and then at the Lister Hospital, Stevenage (1972-1996).

Armour lived in Hitchin, Hertfordshire with his wife Gillian. He has three children:  Jasmin, Sara and Steven. His brother, David S. Ahmed, was consultant surgeon and Vice President of Medical Services, Regina Qu'Appelle Health Region, Canada.

Ophthalmoscope
After retiring Armour made a lens-free direct ophthalmoscope. It is the size of a pen and can be carried in a chest pocket or purse. It is easy to use, functioning with two AAA batteries and a simple on-off switch. It gives a view comparable to a standard ophthalmoscope. Patients with refractive errors of distance vision simply keep their glasses on. It won several awards including two Medical Futures Innovation Awards and the 2005 Edward de Bono medal for application and simplicity, and was placed 2nd in the Saatchi and Saatchi "World Changing Ideas" global competition.. Armour was made FRCP London in 2018.

References

British vascular surgeons
British inventors
2020 deaths
1934 births
Pakistani emigrants to the United Kingdom
People from Murree